Aspergillus caelatus is a species of fungus in the genus Aspergillus. It is from the Flavi section. The species was first described in 1997. It has been isolated from soil in the United States.

Growth and morphology

A. caelatus has been cultivated on both Czapek yeast extract agar (CYA) plates and Malt Extract Agar Oxoid® (MEAOX) plates. The growth morphology of the colonies can be seen in the pictures below.

References 

caelatus
Fungi described in 1997